Ćemanovići is a village in the municipality of Pale, Bosnia and Herzegovina.

References

Populated places in Pale, Bosnia and Herzegovina